Diego Javier Muñoz (born 5 April 1974) is a Spanish cyclist, who has served as a pilot for visually impaired Paralympic competitor Miguel Ángel Clemente Solano. Competing with Clemente, they won a silver at the 2011 World Championships and a bronze at the 2012 Summer Paralympics.

Personal 
Muñoz was born on 5 May 1974 outside of Spain. He is from Murcia, residing in Santiago El Mayor in 2012. In 2013, Muñoz was awarded the bronze Real Orden al Mérito Deportivo.

Cycling 
In 2011, as the pilot for Miguel Ángel Clemente Solano, Muñoz won a silver medal in the track pursuit event. Muñoz competed at the 2012 Summer Paralympics in cycling as a guide for Miguel Ángel Clemente Solano. In the track pursuit event, the pair won a bronze medal when racing head to head against a pair from Ireland.

References 

Paralympic cyclists of Spain
Paralympic bronze medalists for Spain
Cyclists at the 2012 Summer Paralympics
1974 births
Living people
Spanish sighted guides
Paralympic medalists in cycling
Medalists at the 2012 Summer Paralympics